Baishnab Charan Patnaik (1914-2013) was an Indian politician. He was elected to the Lok Sabha, the lower house of the Parliament of India.

Biography
He was born on April 29, 1914. He was expelled from high school when he joined the civil disobedience movement in 1931.

He was one of the vanguards fighting for people's cause and launching movements in the princely states of Odisha, (especially in the former state of Dhenkanal). During Quit India Movement, he led an armed revolt against the Raj and took hold of administration of then Murhi sub- division of Dhenkanal state for over a week. Besides face to face fight he had carried on underground operations and was in jail for many years. As a member of the first Vidhan Sabha of Odisha (1952-1957) and third Lok Sabha (1962-1967) as well, his contributions were commendable towards the reconstruction of the nation in the early phase of our republic.

The valiant Commander of Dhenkanal state people's movement brought into light the heinous and barbaric torture let loose on the people by the cruel Raja of the Dhenkanal Kingdom. He carried on his shoulders the dead body of 12- year old martyr Baji Rout, who sacrificed his life at the bullets of the British on October 11, 1938.

He was inspired by Netaji Subhas Chandra Bose as well as by Bhagabati Charan Panigrahy, Gurucharan Pattanaik and Anant Pattanaik, the trio are founders of Communist Party of India in Orissa and joined the Dhenkanal state peoples movement and freedom struggle. He was jailed from 1939 to 1942 and again from 1948 to 1952 for his struggle against the tyranny of the king. While he was languishing in jail he was elected as a Communist Party MLA in 1952.

Baishnab Pattanaik, during the freedom movement led a procession of young people and set  fire to the Police Station at Madhi (present Kamakshyanagar) and fought face to face with the British police force. Two of his comrades succumbed on the spot and Baishnab Babu got serious bullet injuries on his hand. He then disguised as a dead person and was taken for the funeral pyre at the Brhmani river bank from where he escaped by a boat to Jenapur and Kolkata. While he was on treatment at Kolkata he joined the Communist Party of India and after his recovery returned to Dhenkanal to speed-up the fight against the exploitation of British imperialists and the cruel Dhenkanal state Kingdom.

He was a powerful and popular orator, agitator and artist. He spread the hand written party literature and cyclostyled materials successfully. He was declared as a most dangerous revolutionary by the British and the King. On those days an award of rupees 3200 was declared for his arrest to catch him ‘dead or alive’. But the popular legendary hero could not be caught till 1948.

He died on January 1, 2013, at his residence in Chandan Bazar of Dhenkanal town, Odisha.

References

External links
 Official biographical sketch in Parliament of India website

1914 births
2013 deaths
Lok Sabha members from Odisha
India MPs 1962–1967
Indian National Congress politicians from Odisha
Communist Party of India politicians from Odisha